This page details statistics of the FIBA Europe Cup. Unless notified these statistics concern all seasons since inception of the FIBA Europe Cup in the 2015–16 season, including qualifying rounds.

Winners and runners-up

By club

By country

Semi-final appearances

By club

Participating clubs in the FIBA Europe Cup
The following is a list of clubs that have played or will be playing in FIBA Europe Cup group stages.

Bold: club advanced to the play-offs.
Underlined: club won the FIBA Europe Cup.

Clubs

Performance review

Classification

Performance

See also
Basketball Champions League records and statistics

References

records and statistics
Basketball statistics